The Day of the Bomb (in German Sadako Will Leben, meaning Sadako Wants to Live) is a non-fiction book written by the Austrian author Karl Bruckner in 1961.

The story is about a Japanese girl named Sadako Sasaki who lived in Hiroshima and died of illnesses caused by radiation exposure following the atomic bombing of the city in August 1945.

The book was translated into most major languages, published on the World Wide Web, and is often used as material for peace education in schools around the world.

See also

Children's Peace Monument
Sadako and the Thousand Paper Cranes - 1977

External links
Bruckner, Karl: Sadako will leben  
SADAKO SASAKI 

Children's history books
Austrian children's literature
Books about the atomic bombings of Hiroshima and Nagasaki
Works about children in war
1961 children's books